Tresowes Green is a hamlet in the parish of Germoe, Cornwall, England, United Kingdom.

References

Hamlets in Cornwall